Reginald Baliol Brett, 2nd Viscount Esher,  (30 June 1852 – 22 January 1930) was an historian and Liberal politician in the United Kingdom, although his greatest influence over military and foreign affairs was as a courtier, member of public committees and behind-the-scenes "fixer", or rather éminence grise.

Career courtier and 'fixer'

Background and education
Reginald, known as Regy, Brett was the son of William Baliol Brett, 1st Viscount Esher, and Eugénie Mayer (1814–1904). Born in London, Esher remembered sitting on the lap of an old man who had played the violin for Marie Antoinette, and was educated at Eton and Trinity College, Cambridge. He held a militia commission after Cambridge. His father, who was to be Solicitor-General in Disraeli's first ministry (1868), distinguished himself in the 1867 Reform Act debate dutifully supporting the triumphant Disraeli.  In 1868 he was named a judge on the Court of Common Pleas; in 1876 he became a Lord Justice of Appeal and in 1883 Master of the Rolls. A distinguished common law judge, in 1885 he was raised to the peerage as Baron Esher by Prime Minister Lord Salisbury.  On his retirement as Master of the Rolls in 1897, he was created first Viscount Esher.  "Regy"'s mother was the French step daughter of John Gurwood, the editor of Wellington's Dispatches.

At Eton Brett was taught by influential master William Johnson Cory, whose pupils included the future prime minister Lord Rosebery and others in the highest echelons of society.  Rosebery's idealistic learning from Romantic poets William Wordsworth and Samuel Taylor Coleridge, the classical liberal philosopher John Stuart Mill, the chemistry of Gottfried Wilhelm Leibniz, music of Wolfgang Amadeus Mozart, and Jeremy Bentham were intellectual influences on the young Regy.  Going up to Trinity College, Cambridge, Brett was profoundly influenced by the radical lawyer, politician and professor of international law William Harcourt.  Harcourt controlled Brett's rooms, and lifestyle at Cambridge.  Brett's father had introduced him to Albert Grey's Committee, but had a long-standing dispute with General Charles Grey, the Queen's Equerry.  Brett was admitted to the Society of Apostles, dedicated to emergent philosophies of European atheism; their number included the aristocratic literati of liberalism Frank, Gerald and Eustace Balfour, Frederick and Arthur Myers, Hallam and Lionel Tennyson, Edmund Gurney, S H and J G Butcher. Brett experimented approaching conversion to High Mass from Cardinal John Henry Newman on Sundays in London.  The Oxford Movement included Adam Sedgwick and Frederick William Maitland holding an equally profound sway over his youthful scholarship.

Brett was seen with the Carlton Gardens set of Lady Granville, he was friend of the Clare brothers, introduced by the Earl de Grey.  He visited Howick Park, and took law with Lord Brougham and Vaux.  The famous lawyer's lectures coincided with Justice Brett's employment with Richard Cross, as a parliamentary re-drafter at the Home Office. Albert Grey introductions provided an invitation to the India Office and entrée to meet Sir Bartle Frere, the colonial administrator.  When Disraeli tried to enforce Anglicanism, in the Public Worship Bill, and was defeated, Brett wrote copious letters to Lord Hartington, leader of the Liberal Party in the House of Commons. The consequences were to push Harcourt into the limelight as a leading Liberal in the Commons but moderates tended to be dragged into sharing a religious position when the Disraelian tradition was threatening to split English liberalism. Brett visited the actor's daughter Lady Waldegrave at Strawberry Hill, and took deportment lessons from the Duchess of Manchester at Kimbolton, Hartington's private secretary, stamping his credentials as a rich aesthete.  Regy was a socialite cultivating many friendships among both aristocratic and successful people.  Early on a passion for tradition and imperial liberalism would frustrate the radical right.

Courtier, diplomat and Liberal MP
The Great Eastern Crisis had released the Ottoman Empire from the threat of Russian invasion. However, the success of the Midlothian Campaign had re-energized William Ewart Gladstone's authority as rightful leader of his party; casting Hartington and Brett as marginalized jingoes. Six years later the Whigs would be pushed into the Unionist camp.  Brett needed his vanity satisfied but felt comfortable in neither party.  He rose to become the mediator between Liberal factions, and was a leading light at the Liberal Round Table Conference in 1887.

Having been a Conservative as a young man, Brett began his political career in 1880, as Liberal Member of Parliament for Penryn and Falmouth.  He was Parliamentary Private Secretary to Lord Hartington, when latter was Secretary of State for War (1882–85) and once drove him to a Cabinet meeting on a sleigh through the snow. However he elected to withdraw from public politics in 1885, after losing an election at Plymouth, in favour of a behind the scenes role.  He was instrumental in the Jameson raid of 1895 vigorously defending the imperialist Cecil Rhodes.

In 1895, Brett became Permanent Secretary to the Office of Works, where Edward, Prince of Wales, was impressed by his zeal and dedication to the elderly Queen Victoria. A lift was built at Windsor Castle to get the elderly Queen upstairs in a redecorated palace.  In Kensington Palace, Esher would push the Queen around in wheel chair so she could revisit her childhood. The devoted royal servant would work even more closely with Edward VII after his coronation in 1902. Upon his father's death on 24 May 1899, he succeeded him as 2nd Viscount Esher.

During the Boer War Esher had to intervene in the row between Lord Lansdowne and General Garnet Wolseley, the Commander-in-Chief, who tended to blame the politician for military failures.  He would make the walk between palace and War Office to iron out problems.  Into the political vacuum, Esher wrote the memos that became established civil service procedure.  When the Elgin Commission was asked to report on the conduct of war, it was Esher who wrote it after the "Khaki Election" of 1900, and continued to act to influence both King and parliament.  They met Admiral Jackie Fisher at Balmoral to discuss reform of Naval structures, which relied heavily on Fisher's complex web of relatives in senior posts.

In 1901, Lord Esher was appointed a deputy lieutenant of Berkshire and became Deputy Governor and Constable of Windsor Castle. He remained close to the royal family until his death. By the end of 1903 Esher was meeting or corresponding with King Edward VII every day. He lived at 'Orchard Lea', Winkfield on the edge of the Great Park.  During this period, he helped edit Queen Victoria's papers, publishing a work called Correspondence of Queen Victoria (1907).

From 1903 Esher shunned office, but was a member of Lord Elgin's South African War Commission, which investigated the British Army's near-failure in the Boer War. At this time he was writing to the King daily (and having three or four meetings a day with the King's adviser Lord Knollys), informing him of the views of the Commission, of party leaders, and War Office civil servants with whom he was still in touch from his days working for Hartington. St John Brodrick, Secretary of State for War, was resentful of Esher's influence. Brodrick's scope for operation was paralysed by Esher's circumvention, and the government was much weakened in October 1903 when Joseph Chamberlain and Devonshire resigned over the former's plans for Tariff Reform.

Esher Committee
In 1904 Esher set up a sub-committee of Committee for Imperial Defence, known as the Esher Committee of which he was appointed chairman. To achieve the King's desired reforms of the Army, Esher formed an uneasy alliance with Sir George Clarke, the permanent secretary, to directly undermine H O Arnold-Foster's attempt to block militia reform, Clarke "discountenancing" told him he could not possibly read the Order". The sub-committee was a triumvirate of Esher, Rosebery, and General Murray, notorious for making policy on the hoof misusing ministerial offices. Furious Esher was determined the King should have intervention: on 7 December, Arnold-Foster advised to save £2m the militia must be absorbed into the Army. His scheming encouraged by the King, wanted prime minister Balfour to look to party first, while at the same time warning the King's Secretary that "the Prime Minister will have to take matters into his own hands". Esher's role was for sixty-seven years a secret, by a memorandum behind the scenes, unaccountable to parliament. It was decided on 19 December a Reserve Force should be set up "in commission".  On 12 January Esher told the minister to accept his sub-committee's recommendation, even though Arnold-Foster had not even been told of the agenda.  Despite the intrigues, the King approved of the committee's work.

Esher cultivated a friendship with Colonel Sir Edmund Ward, secretary to the Army Council in order to control minute-taking, the agenda, and meetings quorum telling him he had secret information of "proof of the Army Order"; and a plan known as "Traverse" towards Army decentralisation. That was in September 1904 when the Army Council's powers were still undefined at the time it was enlarged by Lord Knollys. The issue confronting Esher was the Royal Prerogative which had been circumvented "without reference to the Sovereign". He marched into Arnold-Foster's office to remind him that precedent under Victoria had been to yield to arguments from the monarch which had already been put forward by the Adjutant-General.

Liberal War Office

Behind the scenes, he influenced many pre-First World War military reforms and was a supporter of the British–French Entente Cordiale.  He chaired the War Office Reconstitution Committee. This recommended radical reform of the British Army, including the setting up of the Army Council, and established the Committee of Imperial Defence, a permanent secretariat that Esher joined in 1905.  From 1904 all War Office appointments were approved and often suggested by Esher.  He approved the setting up of the Territorial Force, although he saw it as a step towards conscription; a step not taken. Many of Esher's recommendations were nonetheless, implemented under the new Liberal governments of Henry Campbell-Bannerman and H. H. Asquith by Richard Haldane, Secretary of State for War, assisted by Esher's protege the young Major-General Douglas Haig. When Haldane entered the War Office, he was provided with Colonel Sir Gerard Ellison as a new military secretary to make the transitional reforms.  Haldane wished to avoid 'corner cuts' and so established the Information Bureau in the War Office.  Although Esher's biographer Peter Fraser argued "the Haldane reforms owed little to Haldane." The initial Liberal reforms were thrown out by the Lords, and the resulting documents looked like Esher's original efforts.

Esher found his son, Oliver Brett, a job as an additional secretary to John Morley and he was on good terms with Capt Sinclair, Campbell-Bannerman's secretary.

Esher's involvements in the Territorials were not limited to the War Office. He was the first chairman appointed in 1908 to the County of London Territorial Forces Association and its president from 1912 to his death, in addition he was appointed Honorary Colonel of the 5th (Reserve) Battalion of the Royal Fusiliers in 1908 and held the same appointment with the 6th County of London Brigade, Royal Field Artillery, from 1910 to 1921.

Esher's royal triumph and the Entente Cordiale
Esher was appointed a Deputy Lieutenant of the County of London in 1909. and the King's Aide-de-Camp.  Depicted as a disciple of national efficiency, an able administrator, and a silky, smooth influence as a courtier, he was accused of being an arch-insider, undemocratic and interfering.  Moreover, the King liked Esher, and so his influence over the Army grew, leading to a more liberal far-sighted attitude towards the possibility of averting conflict in Europe.  Esher's invaluable contribution prevented further promotion in a political career, in which he had been destined for high cabinet office.  His close political friends in the Liberal party included Edward Marjoribanks and Earl Rosebery.  His aristocratic connections and military experience made him an ideal grandee, but such was the importance of his ties to the monarch, that his career was somewhat restrictive of ambition.  He was by nature ambitious, 'clubbable' sociable, and frequently seen at High Society parties in the fashionable houses of the Edwardian era.  He was secretive and patriotic: accordingly founding the Society of Islanders.  Its one great principle was to build "two for one Keels" over and above any other Navy in the world in order to maintain global peace.

Esher declined many public offices, including the Viceroyalty of India and the Secretaryship for War, a job to which Edward VII had urged he be appointed.

In 1911 Esher helped ease out Lord Knollys, who was then seventy-five years old, having been in the Royal Household since 1862, but who had lost some royal confidence over the negotiation of the Parliament Act.  Esher arranged a replacement as King George V's principal adviser with Lord Stamfordham.

Esher's Great War
In January 1915, Esher visited Premier Aristide Briand in Paris, who told him David Lloyd George had "a longer view than any of our leaders". An earlier opening of a Salonika front might have prevented the entry of Bulgaria into the war". He also made contact with Bunau Varilla, editor of Le Matin, to keep the Russian Empire in "the alliance and Americans to come to aid of Europe".  By 1916 the French war effort was almost spent.  Finance Minister, Alexandre Ribot told them to sue for peace, Esher reported. At the Chantilly Conference they discussed combined operations - "Dans la guerre l'inertie est une honte."  Esher accompanied Sir Douglas Haig to the Amiens Conference, but was back in Paris to be informed of the surprise news of Kitchener's death.  Returning to London Esher spoke with Australian Prime Minister Billy Hughes. The following month at the Beaugency Conference they discussed the Somme Offensive. "For heaven's sake put every ounce you have got of will power into this offensive" he told Maurice Hankey. He often travelled to France to leave the "mephitic" atmosphere of the War Office, on a trip to Liaison Officer, Colonel Sidney Clive at Chantilly. He learnt first hand the French government's scheme for a "Greater Syria" to include British controlled Palestine.  France's ally on the Eastern Front, Russia, had been badly defeated the previous year; so Asquith's neutrality over Briand's Salonika Plan perplexed Esher. He perceived the balance of power in cabinet shifting towards a new more conservative coalition.

During the First World War Esher was, in one writer's description, de facto head of British Intelligence in France, reporting on the French domestic and political situation, although he told his son he preferred not to have a formal position where he would have to take orders. His son Maurice Brett set up a bureau in Paris called Intelligence Anglaise keeping his father informed through a small spy network with links to newspaper journalists.

In 1917 he told Lloyd George that the diplomacy in Paris was weak, informing the Prime Minister that he "was badly served".  The ambassador Lord Bertie was the last of the Victorian imperial envoys, and was failing to do enough to persuade a faltering France to remain fighting in the war. When offered the ambassadorship in Bertie's stead Esher crowed "I cannot imagine anything I would detest more." His considerable diplomatic skills included fluent French and German. The following month there was a French mutiny, as the Poilus were dying in appalling conditions. Haig and Henry Wilson lent their support to an offensive to bolster the French. Phillipe Petain, the new French commander-in-chief, was deemed too defensive: Esher sent Colonel Repington as liaison officer on a 'charm offensive'. Backed by Munitions Minister Winston Churchill and Lord Milner for dramatic action, Esher entered a diplomatic conversation with the Cabinet's War Policy Committee; a unique new departure in the management of British policy. The bad weather and sickness of war made Esher ill in 1917; he was encouraged by the King to holiday at Biarritz.

Partly on Esher's advice, the War Office undertook major re-organization in 1917.  He advised unification of commands, in which all British military commands would be controlled from Whitehall's Imperial War Office only.  Esher was at the famous Crillon Club dinner meeting in Paris on 1 December 1917 in which with Clemenceau they took critical decisions over the strategy for 1918. The Allied Governments proposed a unified Allied Reserve, despite negative press and publicity in the Commons. As cabinet enforcer, Esher visited Henry Wilson on 9 February 1918, during the crisis over his succession to William Robertson as Chief of the Imperial General Staff. Esher became instrumental in remonstrating with loose press articles critical of the war effort in particular, Lord Northcliffe's newspapers and The Morning Post. In France, Esher had established a rapprochement with the press to help hold the Poincare-Clemenceau government together, at a time when England was at the zenith of her military strength."

As the Great War concluded Esher intimated that the King wanted his resignation as Deputy-Governor of Windsor.  In fact he coveted the post of Keeper of the Royal Archives.  Lord Stamfordham demanded his resignation in favour of historian Sir John Fortescue, but Esher remained as Governor.  Professionalization also warned Maurice Hankey against becoming secretary to the Paris Peace Conference, which to Esher's mind was beyond his competence.  Esher also persuaded his friend not to desert the British Empire for the League of Nations. Domestic unrest and trade unionism, which Esher loathed, as it threatened peace and stability, also destabilized his position as President of the Army of India Committee.  Ever skeptical of political changes, "omnivorous" introductions to the Viceroy's work forced him to decline a solicitous offer to chair a sub-committee of the Conditions of the Poor.

Historian and retirement
Esher was admitted to the Privy Council in 1922. In 1928 he became Constable and Governor of Windsor Castle, an office he had always wanted, holding it until his death in 1930.

Lord Esher was also a historian; besides the aforementioned work, he also published works on King Edward VII and Lord Kitchener. Together with Liberal MP Lewis ("Loulou") Harcourt he established the London Museum, which opened its doors on 5 March 1912. In February 1920 he proof read Haig's History of the General Head Quarters 1917–1918.  That summer Esher's critique of a Life of Disraeli appeared in Quarterly Review.  His memoir, Cloud-capp'd Towers, was published in 1927. After his death, his sons published four volumes of his Journals and Letters (1934–1938).

Esher's most cheerful experiences were at Roman Camp in Callander, Scotland.

Honours and arms
British honours
KCB :  Knight Commander the Order of the Bath – announced in the 1902 Coronation Honours list on 26 June 1902 – invested by King Edward while on board his yacht HMY Victoria and Albert on 28 July 1902 (gazetted 11 July 1902)
GCVO: Knight Grand Cross of the Royal Victorian Order (previously KCVO)

Arms

Family
In 1879, Reginald Brett married Eleanor Van de Weyer, daughter of Belgian ambassador Sylvain Van de Weyer and granddaughter of Anglo-American financier Joshua Bates. They had four children.
 Their elder son, Oliver Sylvain Baliol Brett became 3rd Viscount Esher and was a Fellow of the Royal Institute of British Architects. He married Antoinette Heckscher, daughter of August Heckscher.
 Their second son, Maurice Vyner Baliol Brett, married the famous musical theatre actress Zena Dare.
 Their older daughter, Dorothy, was a painter and member of the Bloomsbury Group. She studied at the Slade School of Fine Arts and spent years in New Mexico.
 Their younger daughter, Sylvia, became the last Ranee of Sarawak on 24 May 1917, following the proclamation of her husband Charles Vyner Brooke as Rajah.

Sexuality
Although married with children, Esher had homosexual inclinations; but his flirtations with young men were regarded with tolerant amusement in polite society. The years before his marriage had been marked by a series of what Esher described as "rapturous" love affairs with various young men. His subsequent marriage in no way stopped or curtailed these activities. Indeed, he could not, he told a friend, remember a single day when he was not in love with one young man or another. He later published anonymously a white-covered book of verse called Foam, in which he glorified "golden lads".  According to his biographer, Esher "never deliberately concealed his infatuations" but explicitly confided them to only a few.  Those few included Esher's son Maurice, to whom Maurice wrote prurient and even romantic letters during the boy's time at Eton.

One of his most significant male companions was his private secretary Lawrence Burgis, who met Esher when he was attending King's School, Worcester. Although the relationship likely went physically unconsummated due to Burgis's heterosexuality, they remained closely acquainted until Esher's death in 1930. After the British entry into World War I, Esher personally intervened to have Burgis appointed as an aide-de-camp to the British Expeditionary Force Commander of Intelligence John Charteris so that he could avoid front-line service on the Western Front. Esher also had him appointed as a secretary to the Cabinet Office. Burgis later used his position to keep verbatim records of Prime Minister Winston Churchill's War Cabinet meetings in defiance of the Official Secrets Act 1911, providing one of the most important records of World War II.

References

Bibliography

External links
 
 The Papers of Lord and Lady Esher held at Churchill Archives Centre
 
 

1852 births
1930 deaths
19th-century British LGBT people
Alumni of Trinity College, Cambridge
Bisexual men
Bisexual politicians
Deputy Lieutenants of Berkshire
Deputy Lieutenants of the County of London
Knights Commander of the Order of the Bath
Knights Grand Cross of the Royal Victorian Order
LGBT members of the Parliament of the United Kingdom
LGBT peers
English LGBT politicians
Brett, Reginald
Members of the Privy Council of the United Kingdom
Brett, Reginald
People educated at Eton College
Brett, Reginald
Brett, Reginald
UK MPs who inherited peerages
Viscounts in the Peerage of the United Kingdom